Bernard Melvin Senensky (born December 31, 1944) is a Canadian jazz pianist, organist, and composer.

Life and career
Senensky was born in Winnipeg, Manitoba, on December 31, 1944. He had classical piano lessons from the age of nine and became interested in jazz at about 15. He had one jazz teacher, and thereafter was self-taught.

He moved permanently to Toronto in 1968. He played briefly with high-profile visiting musicians, including Chet Baker, Art Blakey, Art Farmer, and Art Pepper. Senensky played with Moe Koffman between 1980 and 2000; they toured internationally for several years. Senensky has recorded several small group albums since 1975.

Playing style and influences
Senensky described himself as "essentially a bebop player, and beyond. My heroes are anyone from Bud Powell to McCoy Tyner to Keith Jarrett and Herbie Hancock". Senensky was influenced on organ by Larry Goldings, Mike LeDonne, and Larry Young. The New Grove Dictionary of Jazz states that "His playing is characterized by his obvious comfort in a wide range of styles, from swing to the assertive post-bop of his own groups."

Discography
An asterisk (*) indicates that the year is that of release.

As leader/co-leader

Main source:

References

1944 births
Canadian jazz pianists
Hard bop pianists
Musicians from Toronto
Musicians from Winnipeg
Living people
21st-century Canadian pianists